Martin Gerard Hinton  is the Director of Public Prosecutions for South Australia, and a former justice of the Supreme Court of South Australia and Solicitor-General of South Australia. Hinton was admitted to legal practice in December 1989 after completing his studies at the University of South Australia. He worked in the United Kingdom for the Crown Prosecution Service. On his return to Adelaide he worked as a prosecutor for the Director of Public Prosecutions and was appointed Queen's Counsel in 2006. He was appointed Solicitor-General in 2008 and held that office until 2016 when he was appointed to the Supreme Court of South Australia. He resigned as a Judge in late 2019 to take up an appointment as the Director of Public Prosecutions. Hinton is also an adjunct professor at the University of Adelaide  and at the University of South Australia, teaching Constitutional Law.

References

Living people
Judges of the Supreme Court of South Australia
Solicitors-General of South Australia
Year of birth missing (living people)
Australian King's Counsel